Eligmoderma politum is a species of beetle in the family Cerambycidae. It was described by Nonfried in 1895.

References

Eligmodermini
Beetles described in 1895